The Firebrand (also known as Caballero) is a 1962 American Western film directed and produced by Maury Dexter and starring Kent Taylor, Valentin de Vargas and Lisa Montell.

Plot
A Mexican outlaw wages a war against the corrupt California Rangers during the California Gold Rush.

Cast
 Kent Taylor as Maj. Tim Bancroft
 Valentin de Vargas as Joaquin Murieta
 Lisa Montell as Clarita Vasconcelos
 Joe Raciti as Jack Garcia
 Chubby Johnson as Tampico
 Barbara Mansell as Cassie
 Allen Jaffe as Torres
 Troy Melton as Walker
 Fred Krone as Dickens
 Sid Haig as Diego
 Felix Locher as Ramirez
 Jerry Summers as Rafael Vasconcelos
 Tom Daly as California Ranger
 I. Stanford Jolley as California Ranger
 Pat Lawless as California Ranger

References

Citations

Sources

External links

The Firebrand at TCMDB
The Firebrand at BFI

1962 films
American Western (genre) films
1960s English-language films
1962 Western (genre) films
20th Century Fox films
CinemaScope films
Films directed by Maury Dexter
Films scored by Richard LaSalle
1960s American films